The 8th Infantry Division, Philippine Army, known officially as the Storm Trooper Division, is one of the Philippine Army's Infantry units in the Visayas and under the AFP Central Command, combating local communist insurgent units, and terrorists.

History
The division was established on August 1, 1988, with headquarters at Camp General Vicente Lukban, Catbalogan, Samar. The local government soldiers and officers under the 8th Infantry Division of the Philippine Army was sending the combat operations in the Visayas region and the engagements of the Anti-Communist Operations and helping aided and supported of the Armed Forces of the Philippines, Philippine National Police and the CAFGU militia forces against the communist rebels of the Communist Party of the Philippines-New People's Army (CPP-NPA) and other local criminal elements.

During the Operation Enduring Freedom in the Philippines under the War on Terrorism and the Islamic Insurgency in Mindanao, Southern Philippines. The local government troops of the Philippine Army 8th Infantry "Storm Trooper" Division was sending the clearing combat operations in Mindanao on Southern Philippines and the engagements of the Anti-Islamic and Counter-Terrorism operations and helping aided and supporting of the Armed Forces of the Philippines, Philippine National Police, the CAFGU militia forces and the U.S. Armed Forces to fought against the Islamic rebels and bandits of the Moro Islamic Liberation Front (MILF), Moro National Liberation Front (MNLF) and Abu Sayyaf Group (ASG) and other local criminal elements.

Mission

The 8th Infantry (Storm Trooper) Division, Philippine Army often conducts Internal Security Operations (ISO) in their Area of Responsibility (AOR) to dismantle and destroy the remaining guerrilla fronts of the Local Communist Movement (LCM) in order to attain  peace  and  stability  conducive  to  sustainable development in assisting the  Philippine government  in  its  socio-economic development projects; and assists the Philippine National Police curb criminality in the Visayas Region.

Lineage of Commanding Officers
 BGen. Isagani T. Delos Santos, PA – (26 May 1986 – 31 March 1988)
 BGen. Federico E. Ruiz Jr., PA – (31 March 1988 – 27 March 1990)
 BGen. Romulo F. Yap, PA – (27 March 1990 – 10 January 1992)
 BGen. Ruperto A. Ambil, PA – (10 June 1992 – 12 April 1994)
 BGen. Danilo P. Olay, PA – (12 March 1994 – 15 March 1996)
 BGen. Romeo B. Tarrayo, PA – (4 April 1996 – 15 January 1998)
 MGen. Arturo B. Carrillo, PA – (15 January 1998 – 6 November 1999)
 MGen. Rufo A. De Veyra, PA – (6 November 1999 – 7 July 2001)
 MGen. Romeo B. Dominguez, PA – (6 July 2001 – 10 February 2003)
 MGen. Glenn J. Rabonza, PA – (10 February 2003 – 4 January 2005)
 BGen. Bonifacio B. Ramos, PA – (4 January 2005 – 10 February 2005)
 MGen. Jovito S. Palparan Jr., PA – (10 February 2005 – 25 August 2005)
 MGen. Bonifacio B. Ramos, PA – (25 August 2005 – 29 July 2006)
 BGen. Randy S. Dauz, PA – (29 July 2006 – 16 August 2006)
 MGen. Rodrigo F. Maclang, PA – (16 August 2006 – 15 January 2007)
 MGen. Armando L. Cunanan, PA – (15 January 2007 – 19 May 2008)
 BGen. Allan Ragpala, PA – (19 May 2008 – 4 June 2008)
 BGen. Arthur I. Tabaquero, PA – (4 June 2008 – 24 August 2010)
 MGen. Mario F. Chan, PA – (24 August 2010 – 8 April 2012)
 MGen. Gerardo T. Layug, PA – (8 April 2012 – September 2013)
 MGen. Jet B. Velarmino, PA – (13 September 2013 – 6 October 2016) 
 MGen. Raul M. Farnacio, PA – (6 October 2016 – 5 June 2019)
 MGen. Pio Q. Diñoso III, PA – (5 June 2019 – 9 October 2021)
 BGen. Wilbur C. Mamawag, PA – (9 October 2021 – 6 December 2021) (acting)
 MGen. Edgardo Y. De Leon, PA – (6 December 2021 – 23 September 2022) 
 BGen. Zosimo A. Oliveros, PA – (23 September 2022 – 21 October 2022) (acting)
 MGen. Camilo Z. Ligayo, PA – (21 October 2022 – Present)

Current Units
The following are the Brigades under the 8th Infantry Division:
 801st Infantry (Bantay at Gabay) Brigade
 802nd Infantry (Peerless) Brigade
 803rd Infantry (Peacemaker) Brigade

The following are the Battalions under the 8th Infantry Division:
 14th Infantry (Avenger) Battalion
 19th Infantry (Commando) Battalion
 20th Infantry (We Lead) Battalion
 31st Infantry (Charge) Battalion
 34th Infantry (Reliable) Battalion
 43rd Infantry (We Search) Battalion
 46th Infantry (Peace Makers) Battalion
 52nd Infantry (Catch 'Em) Battalion
 63rd Infantry (Innovator) Battalion
 78th Infantry (Warrior) Battalion
 87th Infantry (Hinirang) Battalion
 93rd Infantry (Bantay Kapayapaan) Battalion

The following are the Support Units under the 8th Infantry Division:
 Headquarters and Headquarters Service Battalion
 Service Support Battalion
 8th Signal Battalion
 8th Dental Detachment
 8th Military Police Company
 8th Post Engineer Detachment
 8th Civil Military Operations (Dangpanan) Battalion
 8th Division Training School
 8th Field Artillery Battery (S)
 8th Light Armor Company (S)

Operations
 Government Arsenal
 Anti-guerrilla operations against the New People's Army
 Operation Enduring Freedom - Philippines.
 Office of the Civil Defense

Incidents

Killing of Leonard Co, Sofronio Cortez, and Julius Borromeo
On November 15, 2010, Botanist Leonard Co, forester Sofronio Cortez, and farmer Julius Borromeo, were working on a biodiversity project under the auspices of the Energy Development Corporation when they were killed in an incident involving nine members of the 19th Infantry Battalion in the forests of Kananga, Leyte. Co, who was considered the foremost authority in ethnobotany in the Philippines at the time of his death, was examining a tree when the shooting began, while Cortez and Borromeo helping him.

Members of the 19IB, a unit under the 8ID, claimed that Co's group had been caught in the crossfire in a fight between their unit and the New People's Army, but this claim was challenged by numerous investigating groups, including the Philippine National Police and the Philippines' Commission on Human Rights. The Department of Justice eventually filed charges against the soldiers involved, and the case is currently in the courts.

External Entrusion
Philippine Army Reserve Command - all graduates of the Citizen Army Training and the Reserve Officer Training Corps are mandated to merge to as National Defense in case of a National Entrusion.

References

 http://www.army.mil.ph/Army_Sites/
 https://archive.today/20121221055258/http://army.mil.ph/Army_Sites/INFANTRY%20DIVISIONS/8ID/

Infantry divisions of the Philippines
Military units and formations established in 1988